The International Treaty on Plant Genetic Resources for Food and Agriculture (also known as ITPGRFA, International Seed Treaty or Plant Treaty), is a comprehensive international agreement in harmony with the Convention on Biological Diversity, which aims at guaranteeing food security through the conservation, exchange and sustainable use of the world's plant genetic resources for food and agriculture (PGRFA), the fair and equitable benefit sharing arising from its use, as well as the recognition of farmers' rights. It was signed in 2001 in Madrid, and entered into force on 29 June 2004.

Main features

Participating countries
There are 148 contracting parties to the Plant Treaty (147 Member States and 1 intergovernmental organization, the European Union) as of November 2020.

Farmers' rights
The treaty recognises farmers' rights, subject to national laws to: a) the protection of traditional knowledge relevant to plant genetic resources for food and agriculture; b) the right to equitably participate in sharing benefits arising from the utilisation of plant genetic resources for food and agriculture; and c) the right to participate in making decisions, at the national level, on matters related to the conservation and sustainable use of plant genetic resources for food and agriculture. The Treaty establishes the Multilateral System of Access and Benefit-sharing to facilitate plant germplasm exchanges and benefit sharing through Standard Material Transfer Agreement (SMTA).

However, as Regine Andersen of the farmers' rights project, among others, including Olivier De Schutter, the UN Special Rapporteur on the Right to Food, argue, the interpretation and realisation of farmers' rights is weak and is not the same across all countries. Without a consistent, strong international focus on realising the rights of farmers who conserve and sustainably use PGRFA to save, use, exchange and sell seeds saved on-farm, genetic variety of crops and related agricultural biodiversity will suffer. India, for example, includes an interpretation of farmers' rights in its Plant Variety Protection and Farmers' Rights (PPV&FR) Act, 2001, allowing farmers a restricted right to save and sell seed they have produced on-farm as they always have, even if it contains genes from a protected variety.

In 2019, the adoption of the United Nations Declaration on the Rights of Peasants and other people working in rural areas reaffirmed the farmers' rights contained in the Plant Treaty.

Multilateral system
The treaty has implemented a Multilateral System (MLS) of access and benefit sharing, among those countries that ratify the treaty, for a list of 64 of some of the most important food and forage crops essential for food security and interdependence. The genera and species are listed in Annex 1 to the treaty.

The treaty was negotiated by the Food and Agriculture Organization of the United Nations (FAO) Commission on Genetic Resources for Food and Agriculture (CGRFA) and since 2006 has its own Governing Body under the aegis of the FAO.  The Governing Body is the highest organ of the Treaty as established in Article 19. Composed of representatives of all Contracting Parties, its basic function is to promote the full implementation of the Treaty, including the provision of policy guidance on the implementation of the Treaty. The Governing Body elects its Chairperson and Vice-Chairpersons, in conformity with its Rules of Procedure. They are collectively referred to as "the Bureau".

Some believe the treaty could be an example of responsible global governance for ensuring that plant genetic resources essential for present and future food security can be kept accessible to all farmers and in the public domain. Chapter 7 of the Second Report on the State of the World's Plant Genetic Resources for Food and Agriculture (SoWPGR-2) entitled "Access to Plant Genetic Resources, the sharing of benefits arising out of their utilization and the realization of Farmers' Rights" is mainly dedicated to the International Treaty.

Governing Body
 The Governing Body met for the first time in Madrid in June 2006. It had a ministerial segment and a ministerial declaration was adopted and included in the Report.
 The Second Session of the Governing Body was held in Rome in October/November 2007. This meeting discussed the implementation of Farmers' Rights, financial rules; the funding strategy, relationship with the Global Crop Diversity Trust; implementation of the Multilateral System (MLS) for access and benefit-sharing, among other issues.
 The Third Session of the Governing Body was held in Tunis in June 2009. This meeting continued the unfinished business of the previous meeting and discussed, among other issues, funding strategy, compliance, sustainable use, the implementation of Farmers' Rights, relationship with the Global Crop Diversity Trust and the CGRFA, implementation of the Multilateral System (MLS) for access and benefit-sharing.
 The Fourth Session of the Governing Body was held in Bali, Indonesia in March 2011. Prior to the Governing Body meeting, Ministers adopted the Bali Declaration on the Treaty that commits them to engage in further enhancing Treaty implementation to help meet the challenges of agricultural biodiversity erosion, food insecurity, extreme poverty and the effects of climate change; and calls upon parties and relevant stakeholders to prioritize activities relevant to the MLS, sustainable use of PGRFA, and Farmers' Rights, and to mobilize more funds. With the addition of 'compliance' mechanisms and financial rules, these issues took up most negotiating time in the Governing Body meeting. The relationship of the Treaty with the CGRFA, the CBD's Nagoya Protocol, the Global Crop Diversity Trust and Bioversity International were also included in resolutions.
 The Fifth Session of the Governing Body was held in Muscat, Oman in September 2013. The session was preceded by two days of regional consultations. The Fifth Session achieved:
a resolution on Farmers' Rights (FRs), which renewed the commitment of governments to implement Farmers' Rights;
a coded call to UPOV and WIPO to report on their impacts on Farmers' Rights;
warm acceptance of the offer by Farmers' Organisations to produce a report for GB6 on the state of implementation of Farmers' Rights;
actions designed to improve the sustainable use of Plant Genetic Resources for Food and Agriculture, linked to commitments to realise Farmers' Rights;
commitments to review and change the multi-lateral Access and Benefit Sharing mechanism (MLS), to prevent pillaging of the System by patents on native traits, for example;
significant new voluntary financial contributions from Norway for the Global Crop Diversity Trust and for the benefit sharing fund to support on-farm conservation; 
acceptance of the distinction between NGOs and Farmers' Organisations and the need to include representatives of farmers' social movements in negotiations;
a request to the Secretary to report on relevant discussions that relate to Farmers' Rights within other UN fora including the Committee on World Food Security. Civil Society including NGOs (e.g. CENESTA) and the International Farmers' Movement, La Via Campesina, were active throughout the Session.

List of crops covered in Annex 1
Even foods that have been part of a culture for centuries often are indigenous to a region on the other side of the world. This global dispersal shows the generosity with which farmers and farming communities have always shared seeds and genetic materials with neighbors or through trade. As people ventured forth, looking for new lands, their seeds were part of their diasporas. As a result, we now live in a world in which not one country can be considered self-sufficient in terms of being able to survive solely on crops indigenous within its borders. The Treaty facilitates the continued open exchange of food crops and their genetic materials.

The list of plant genetic material included in the Multilateral System of the Treaty is made of major food crops and forages.  The Forages are also divided in legume forages and grass forages. They were selected taking into account the criteria of food security and country interdependence.

History, negotiations, and entry into force
The treaty was under negotiation for 7 years. A previous voluntary agreement, the International Undertaking on Plant Genetic Resources for Food and Agriculture (IU), was adopted in 1983. However, the IU was reliant on the principle of genetic resources being the common heritage of humanity. The Convention on Biological Diversity (CBD) (1993) brought genetic resources under the jurisdiction and sovereignty of national governments. However, the CBD recognised the special and distinctive nature of agricultural genetic resources: they were international – crossing countries and continents – their conservation and sustainable use requires distinctive solutions and they were important internationally for food security. Subsequently, the IU was renegotiated, to bring it in harmony with the CBD, and was renamed as a treaty. An account of the long process to achieve the treaty called Negotiating the Seed Treaty can be found at Wayback Machine.

The treaty was approved during the FAO Conference (31st Session resolution 3/2001) on 3 November 2001, with 116 votes and 2 abstentions (USA and Japan). In accordance with its Article 25, it was opened for signatures until 4 November 2002 by all members of FAO or any state member of the United Nations or of the International Atomic Energy Agency. It was subject to ratification, acceptance or approval (Article 26), by all members.

The International Treaty on Plant Genetic Resources for Food and Agriculture was open to accession a year after adoption and once closed to signatures (Article 27), i.e., on 4 November 2002. 77 countries and the European Union had signed the treaty by that date.

In accordance with Article 28, the treaty entered into force on the ninetieth day after the deposit of the fortieth instrument of ratification, acceptance, approval or accession, provided that at least twenty instruments of ratification, acceptance, approval or accession have been deposited by Members of FAO. Having reached the required number of instruments in order for the treaty to enter into force (40) on 31 March 2004, on which date 13 instruments (including the European Union) were deposited with the Director-General of FAO, the date of entry into force was on 29 June 2004.

Discussions and criticism
Plant genetic resources are essential to a sustainable agriculture and food security. FAO estimates humans have used some 10,000 species for food throughout history. However, only about 120 cultivated species provide around 90% of food requirements and four species (maize, wheat, rice and potatoes) provide about 60% of human dietary energy for the world's population. Of the myriad of varieties of these crops developed by farmers over millennia, which form an important part of agricultural biodiversity, more than 75% have been lost in the past 100 years.

Some fear that corporate financial interests might prevent safeguarding of livelihoods, promotion of food security, biodiversity-rich farming under control of local communities, and implementation of Farmers' Rights.

Critics say many of the central issues are unresolved or open to interpretation. Some of the points raised are:

 to what extent will intellectual property rights be allowed on genetic resources in the MLS, within treaty rules: some argue an agreement aiming at open access to genetic resources for food and agriculture should not allow restrictive property rights, and the treaty says in Article 12.3.d that "Recipients shall not claim any intellectual property or other rights that limit the facilitated access to the plant genetic resources for food and agriculture, or their genetic parts or components, in the form received from the Multilateral System";
 to what extent will farmers and communities be allowed to freely use, exchange, sell and breed the seeds, and what enforcement procedures will be used by national governments to ensure principles of Farmers' Rights will be respected;
The mechanism for dispute settlement under the Third Party Beneficiary and the role of FAO.
The first group of 11 projects funded by the treaty was announced during the Third Session of the Governing Body in Tunis in June 2009. The projects were funded according to criteria established by the Governing Body including regional balance: 5 from Latin America, 5 from Africa and 1 from Asia.  The ranking of the projects was done by a Group of Experts nominated by the 7 regional representatives of the Bureau and the final approval was done by the Bureau on behalf of the Governing Body.
 While the whole Brassica family (Cruciferae) including all its sub-species and varieties is in the MLS, the total number of food crops and forages and their relatives included in the treaty is very limited. Soya, sugar cane, oil palm and groundnut are among important crops missing from the list in Annex 1.

The treaty came into force on 29 June 2004, at which time there were more than 54 ratifications by countries. An article prepared on the occasion of the treaty becoming law is posted at International Seed Treaty becomes Law - 29 June 2004. From the entry into force, countries that previously signed are allowed to ratify the treaty, while countries that did not sign the treaty before it came into force can also accede to it. The instrument of ratification has to be deposited with the Director-General of FAO.

Further reading
  213 p. 
  36 p.
  59 p.
  155 p.

See also
 Biopiracy
 Seedbank
 Plant genetic resources
 Germplasm
 Genesys
 Convention on Biological Diversity
 Nagoya Protocol to the Convention on Biological Diversity
 UPOV Convention on New Varieties of Plants
 United Nations Declaration on the Rights of Peasants

External links 
Official text of the Plant Treaty
www.planttreaty.com FAO's official website of the Plant Treaty
Genetic Imperialism? from the Dean Peter Krogh Foreign Affairs Digital Archives 
https://web.archive.org/web/20110311020736/http://www.itpgrfa.net/ – Official website of the Treaty
FAO: Leipzig Global Plan of Action (GPA)
https://web.archive.org/web/20130721052109/http://globalplanofaction.org/ – Portal for PGRFA issues
FAO: Second Report on the State of the World's PGRFA
https://web.archive.org/web/20071226173200/http://www.croptrust.org/main/ – Global Crop Diversity Trust
UK Agricultural Biodiversity Copendium: Civil Society pages on the International Treaty and its negotiation
 http://www.bioversityinternational.org – CGIAR's agricultural biodiversity research centre's pages on the Treaty

References

Agricultural treaties
Food treaties
Biodiversity
Food and Agriculture Organization treaties
Food security
Intellectual property treaties
Plant conservation
Plant breeding
Seeds
Sustainable agriculture
Treaties concluded in 2001
Treaties entered into force in 2004
Treaties establishing intergovernmental organizations
Treaties of Afghanistan
Treaties of Albania
Treaties of Algeria
Treaties of Angola
Treaties of Armenia
Treaties of Australia
Treaties of Austria
Treaties of Bangladesh
Treaties of Belgium
Treaties of Benin
Treaties of Bhutan
Treaties of Brazil
Treaties of Brunei
Treaties of Bulgaria
Treaties of Burkina Faso
Treaties of Burundi
Treaties of Cambodia
Treaties of Cameroon
Treaties of Canada
Treaties of the Central African Republic
Treaties of Chad
Treaties of Chile
Treaties of the Republic of the Congo
Treaties of the Cook Islands
Treaties of Costa Rica
Treaties of Ivory Coast
Treaties of Croatia
Treaties of Cuba
Treaties of Cyprus
Treaties of the Czech Republic
Treaties of North Korea
Treaties of the Democratic Republic of the Congo
Treaties of Denmark
Treaties of Djibouti
Treaties of Ecuador
Treaties of Egypt
Treaties of El Salvador
Treaties of Eritrea
Treaties of Estonia
Treaties of Ethiopia
Treaties of Fiji
Treaties of Finland
Treaties of France
Treaties of Gabon
Treaties of Germany
Treaties of Ghana
Treaties of Greece
Treaties of Guatemala
Treaties of Guinea
Treaties of Guinea-Bissau
Treaties of Guyana
Treaties of Honduras
Treaties of Hungary
Treaties of Iceland
Treaties of India
Treaties of Indonesia
Treaties of Iran
Treaties of Iraq
Treaties of Ireland
Treaties of Italy
2001 in Italy
Treaties of Jamaica
Treaties of Japan
Treaties of Jordan
Treaties of Kenya
Treaties of Kiribati
Treaties of Kuwait
Treaties of Kyrgyzstan
Treaties of Laos
Treaties of Latvia
Treaties of Lebanon
Treaties of Lesotho
Treaties of Liberia
Treaties of the Libyan Arab Jamahiriya
Treaties of Liechtenstein
Treaties of Lithuania
Treaties of Luxembourg
Treaties of Madagascar
Treaties of Malawi
Treaties of Malaysia
Treaties of the Maldives
Treaties of Mali
Treaties of the Marshall Islands
Treaties of Mauritania
Treaties of Mauritius
Treaties of Moldova
Treaties of Montenegro
Treaties of Morocco
Treaties of Myanmar
Treaties of Namibia
Treaties of Nepal
Treaties of the Netherlands
Treaties of Nicaragua
Treaties of Niger
Treaties of Norway
Treaties of Oman
Treaties of Pakistan
Treaties of Palau
Treaties of Panama
Treaties of Papua New Guinea
Treaties of Paraguay
Treaties of Peru
Treaties of the Philippines
Treaties of Poland
Treaties of Portugal
Treaties of Qatar
Treaties of South Korea
Treaties of Romania
Treaties of Rwanda
Treaties of Samoa
Treaties of São Tomé and Príncipe
Treaties of Saudi Arabia
Treaties of Senegal
Treaties of Serbia
Treaties of Seychelles
Treaties of Sierra Leone
Treaties of Singapore
Treaties of Slovakia
Treaties of Slovenia
Treaties of Spain
Treaties of Sri Lanka
Treaties of Saint Lucia
Treaties of the Republic of the Sudan (1985–2011)
Treaties of Eswatini
Treaties of Sweden
Treaties of Switzerland
Treaties of Syria
Treaties of Togo
Treaties of Tonga
Treaties of Trinidad and Tobago
Treaties of Tunisia
Treaties of Turkey
Treaties of Uganda
Treaties of the United Arab Emirates
Treaties of the United Kingdom
Treaties of Tanzania
Treaties of Tuvalu
Treaties of Uruguay
Treaties of Venezuela
Treaties of Yemen
Treaties of Zambia
Treaties of Zimbabwe
Treaties entered into by the European Union
Treaties extended to Aruba
Treaties extended to the Faroe Islands
Treaties extended to Greenland
Treaties extended to the Netherlands Antilles
Treaties of Antigua and Barbuda
Treaties of Malta
Treaties of the United States
Treaties of Argentina
Treaties of Bolivia